The Devil in the Bottle (French: Le diable en bouteille) is a 1935 French-German drama film directed by Heinz Hilpert, Reinhart Steinbicker and Raoul Ploquin. It stars Käthe von Nagy, Pierre Blanchar and Gina Manès.

It was made by the German studio UFA as a French-language remake of its 1934 film Liebe, Tod und Teufel. Both films are based on Robert Louis Stevenson's story The Bottle Imp.

The film's sets were designed by the art directors Otto Hunte and Willy Schiller.

Cast
 Käthe von Nagy as Kolua  
 Pierre Blanchar as Keave  
 Gina Manès as Rubby  
 Paul Azaïs as Lopaka  
 Gabriel Gabrio as Mounier 
 Roger Karl as Le marchand  
 Marguerite de Morlaye as La comtesse  
 Suzy Pierson as Bertie - La femme de chambre  
 Georges Malkine as Vikhom  
 Roger Legris as Tirill  
 Daniel Mendaille as Jerry  
 Bill Bocket as Balmez  
 Léon Roger-Maxime as Hein  
 Philippe Richard as Macco  
 Gaston Dubosc as Le comte  
 Henri Richard as Le notaire  
 Gaston Mauger as Collins
 Henri Bosc as Le gouverneur

References

Bibliography
 Goble, Alan. The Complete Index to Literary Sources in Film. Walter de Gruyter, 1999.

External links 
 

1935 films
1930s fantasy drama films
French fantasy drama films
German fantasy drama films
1930s French-language films
Films directed by Heinz Hilpert
Films directed by Raoul Ploquin
Films directed by Reinhart Steinbicker
Films based on works by Robert Louis Stevenson
Films based on short fiction
Films about wish fulfillment
Films set in Oceania
French multilingual films
UFA GmbH films
German black-and-white films
French black-and-white films
1935 multilingual films
1935 drama films
1930s French films
1930s German films